is a former Japanese football player.

Club statistics

References

External links

J. League

1983 births
Living people
Heisei International University alumni
Association football people from Fukushima Prefecture
Japanese footballers
J2 League players
J3 League players
Japan Football League players
Thespakusatsu Gunma players
FC Gifu players
Arte Takasaki players
V-Varen Nagasaki players
Fukushima United FC players
Association football defenders